The Ruined Castle is a rock formation in the Jamison Valley area of the Blue Mountains, in New South Wales, Australia.

Formation

The Ruined Castle is an outcrop of large rocky boulders that lies halfway of a ridge that starts from Castle Head, off Narrow Neck Peninsula, to Mount Solitary. A local elevated point, it is projected from the surrounding bushland, and provides panoramic views of the area.

Geography
It is reached by the Federal Pass, which can be accessed via the Scenic Railway, the Furber Steps (which descends from Scenic World) or the Golden Stairs (which descend from the Narrow Neck Plateau, south-west of Katoomba).  The Federal Pass continues south-east from Ruined Castle to Mount Solitary. Near the track up to Ruined Castle are the sealed openings of several coal mine adits. In this area is a large clearing which was once home to the mining community and is now a campground. 

Used as a staging point for the south end of the aerial ropeway, there were several access points to the local coal seams used by John Britty North for retrieving coal and shale oil ore back to Malaita Point. After the collapse of the ropeway, the current walking track was developed as a horse drawn rail track to connect to the rail system used connecting Malaita Point to the Megalong Valley.

References

Geography of the Blue Mountains (New South Wales)
Rock formations of New South Wales
Tourist attractions in New South Wales

External links 
Self-Guided Ruined Castle Trips With Optional Hiking Equipment Rental